In the theory of complex systems, a function tree is a diagram showing the dependencies between the functions of a system. It breaks a problem (or its solution) down into simpler parts.

When used in computer programming, a function tree visualizes which function calls another.

Diagrams